The Purépecha flag is the official flag of the Purépecha people, an Indigenous nation in Michoacán, Mexico. This flag consists of four fields of four colors with a shield and the words Juchari Uinapekua (Our Strength) below the shield. This flag is unique in its kind and emerged in the town of Santa Fe de la Laguna in 1980. It is an ethnic flag of Mexico.

History
The Purépecha flag emerged as a symbol of union and identity with all the Purépecha people, seeking at the same time the organization and struggle of the Purépechas against the new forms of domination and exploitation that constantly attack indigenous and tribal communities, as well as a tribute to all who have fallen by the front of the Purépecha traditions and for the integrality of the communal lands. This includes the natives murdered on November 10, 1810 in Colima City by the breeders and white guards of Quiroga.

In recent years, the Purepecha flag that appeared in 1980 emerged again. It is a civil insignia that uses the colors of the flag and began to have a strong presence in the Michoacán, especially in those who speak the Purepecha language. In the absence of a document that regulates the use of this emblem, it has taken a number of variants that do not correspond to symbolic ideas and have led to discussions about the historical design of the flag.

References

Flags of Mexico
Purépecha people
Native American flags
Purépecha